New Auburn is a village in Barron and Chippewa counties in the U.S. state of Wisconsin. The population was 548 at the 2010 census. Of this, 528 were in Chippewa County, and 20 were in Barron County. The village is located mostly within the Town of Auburn in Chippewa County. Small portions extend east into the adjacent Town of Bloomer, Chippewa County and north into the Town of Dovre in Barron County.

Geography
New Auburn is located at  (45.203766, -91.561570).

According to the United States Census Bureau, the village has a total area of  containing no bodies of water inside.

New Auburn is along U.S. Highway 53; and also County Roads AA, M, Q, and SS.

Demographics

2010 census
As of the census of 2010, there were 548 people, 217 households, and 139 families living in the village. The racial makeup of the village was 97.3% White, 0.2% African American, 0.2% Native American, 0.4% Asian, and 2.0% from two or more races.

There were 217 households, of which 36.9% had children under the age of 18 living with them, 47.9% were married couples living together, 9.7% had a female householder with no husband present, 6.5% had a male householder with no wife present, and 35.9% were non-families. 30.4% of all households were made up of individuals, and 12.4% had someone living alone who was 65 years of age or older. The average household size was 2.53 and the average family size was 3.13.

The median age in the village was 34.6 years. 29% of residents were under the age of 18; 7.7% were between the ages of 18 and 24; 27.6% were from 25 to 44; 22.4% were from 45 to 64; and 13.3% were 65 years of age or older. The gender makeup of the village was 52.0% male and 48.0% female.

2000 census
As of the census of 2000, there were 562 people, 216 households, and 147 families living in the village. The population density was 165.8 people per square mile (64.0/km2). There were 222 housing units at an average density of 65.5 per square mile (25.3/km2). The racial makeup of the village was 99.11% White, 0.18% Native American, and 0.71% from two or more races. Hispanic or Latino of any race were 0.36% of the population.

There were 216 households, out of which 34.3% had children under the age of 18 living with them, 50.9% were married couples living together, 11.6% had a female householder with no husband present, and 31.9% were non-families. 26.9% of all households were made up of individuals, and 9.3% had someone living alone who was 65 years of age or older. The average household size was 2.60 and the average family size was 3.17.

In the village, the population was spread out, with 30.8% under the age of 18, 5.7% from 18 to 24, 28.1% from 25 to 44, 23.1% from 45 to 64, and 12.3% who were 65 years of age or older. The median age was 35 years. For every 100 females, there were 100.7 males. For every 100 females age 18 and over, there were 100.5 males.

The median income for a household in the village was $30,341, and the median income for a family was $36,250. Males had a median income of $26,683 versus $20,375 for females. The per capita income for the village was $13,444. 9.9% of the population and 9.6% of families were below the poverty line. Out of the total population, 9.9% of those under the age of 18 and 6.7% of those 65 and older were living below the poverty line.

Population: 485 
New Auburn is the setting of Michael Perry's memoir, Population: 485: Meeting your Neighbors One Siren at a Time, in which he describes his experiences as a volunteer firefighter and EMT for the New Auburn Area Fire Department.

Notable people 
Arnt Erickson, businessman and politician; village supervisor and resident of New Auburn (born in Norway)
Michael Perry, author, born and raised in New Auburn

References

External links
 New Auburn Official Website
 New Auburn School District

Villages in Wisconsin
Villages in Chippewa County, Wisconsin
Villages in Barron County, Wisconsin
Eau Claire–Chippewa Falls metropolitan area